The Nuku'alofa Tonga Temple (formerly the Tongan Temple) is the 25th constructed and 23rd operating temple of the Church of Jesus Christ of Latter-day Saints (LDS Church). It is located in the middle of Tonga's main island Tongatapu near Matangiake. The area where the temple is located is commonly known as Liahona, after the name of the church-owned high school there. The temple is several miles south of its namesake city, the capital Nukualofa.

The temple is the only one in Tonga, and has a floor plan similar to other southern Pacific temples, including the Apia Samoa (rebuilt in 2005) and the Papeete Tahiti temples.  It was built with a modern single-spire design, similar to the Bern Switzerland Temple and the London England Temple. Most of the construction work on the temple was done by labor missionaries from New Zealand and other South Pacific Islands.

History
The Nuku'alofa Tonga Temple was announced on 2 April 1980, and dedicated on 9 August 1983 by Gordon B. Hinckley.

The temple was closed for renovation in July 2006. After completion, an open house was held September 29 to October 20, 2007, and the temple was rededicated on November 4, 2007 by Russell M. Nelson.

After he was released as president of Brigham Young University-Hawaii in 2007, Eric B. Shumway became the temple president.

In 2020, the Nuku'alofa Tonga Temple was closed in response to the coronavirus pandemic.

See also

 Eric B. Shumway, a former temple president
 Comparison of temples of The Church of Jesus Christ of Latter-day Saints
 List of temples of The Church of Jesus Christ of Latter-day Saints
 List of temples of The Church of Jesus Christ of Latter-day Saints by geographic region
 Temple architecture (Latter-day Saints)
 The Church of Jesus Christ of Latter-day Saints in Tonga

References

External links
 
Nuku'alofa Tonga Temple Official site
Nuku'alofa Tonga Temple at ChurchofJesusChristTemples.org

20th-century Latter Day Saint temples
Buildings and structures in Nukuʻalofa
Religious buildings and structures in Tonga
Religious buildings and structures completed in 1983
Temples (LDS Church) in Oceania
The Church of Jesus Christ of Latter-day Saints in Tonga
1983 establishments in Tonga